Guiyang–Guangzhou high-speed railway, also known as the Guiguang HSR, is a high-speed railway line in southern China between Guiyang in Guizhou Province and Guangzhou in Guangdong Province. The railway is dedicated to high speed passenger rail service. The line was built from 2008 to 2014 and opened on December 26, 2014.

The line traverses rugged karst terrain in Guizhou and Guangxi and relies on extensive bridges and tunnels, which comprise 83% of the line's total length. The travel time by train between the two terminal cities was reduced from 20 hours to 4 hours.

History

The Guiguang HSR was a major trunk route planned in the 11th Five Year Plan by the Chinese government. It is designed to serve as a rapid rail link between the southwest China and the Pearl River Delta. Construction began in 2008 and was completed in 2014.

Route 
The Guiguang HSR takes a more direct route between its terminal cities, and crosses exceptionally difficult and mountainous terrain, which made construction very costly. The project cost an estimated 85.8 billion RMB (USD$12.5 billion), although this figure was later revised to 94.6 billion RMB (USD$13.8 billion).

The line runs from Guangzhou through Foshan, Sanshui and Zhaoqing in the densely populated Pearl River Delta and then crosses the Lingnan mountain range via Huaiji into Guangxi. It continues in a northwesterly direction through Hezhou and Zhongxiang to the famed scenic cities of Yangshuo and Guilin and then on to Sanjiang. The line enters Guizhou at Congjiang near the southeast tip of the province and passes Rongjiang, Sandu, Duyun, and Longli on to Guiyang in the center of the province.

This line traverses 270 tunnels and 510 valleys across the karst landscape. Bridges and tunnels account for 83% of the line's total length, including 92% in Guizhou.

Stations

Accidents and incidents
4 June 2022 – Around 10:30AM CST, train  at Rongjiang railway station following a collision with landslide just after exiting the Yuezhai Tunnel entrance. Leading to the death of the driver who noticed an "abnormality" on the track and engaged the emergency brakes and minimized the disaster. Upon derailing train slid more than 900 meters. The front car of the train swept out to the opposing track and finally stopped wedged on to the platform Rongjiang railway station. One crew member and seven passengers sustained injuries. Train G2929 passed through the tunnel normally and entered Rongjiang railway station 15 minutes earlier, meaning the landslide happened quite suddenly. Repair work of the line was completed and resumed normal operation the next day.

References 

High-speed railway lines in China
Rail transport in Guangdong
Rail transport in Guangxi
Rail transport in Guizhou
Railway lines opened in 2014
Airport rail links in China